Alfred W. Pettibone (March 14, 1835 – September 2, 1914) was one of the first Bellingham residents and pioneers who actively participated in the city's formation, in particular developing the merchandise trade and real estate businesses. 

Pettibone was the first to establish such businesses in Whatcom, Washington, which were developed with the help of his brother and sons. In the beginning of his career, he worked as a trader in Victoria and Langley, Canada, supplying international explorers, and then became one of the biggest local merchants in Lodi, Wisconsin, during the American Civil War. 

The Pettibones' family house in Bellingham, built on Eldridge Avenue, later became one of the city's historic buildings.

Early life, family and education

Pettibone was born on March 14, 1835, in Waldo, Ohio. His parents, lawyer Hiram R. Pettibone and Jane (Curtis) Pettibone, were both born in Grand Bay, Connecticut. Pettibone had a sister named Jennie A. Pettibone (later Krammer) and a brother, W. C. Pettibone. The Pettibone family was of French origin and went to Wales during the Huguenot troubles. In 1635, they settled in Connecticut. 

Pettibone was educated in the public schools of Fremont, Ohio, and then went to Beloit, Wisconsin, where he took a six-year educational course at Beloit College.

Career

Career in Wisconsin and Washington states
 
In 1856, Pettibone went to Portage, Wisconsin, where he worked as a clerk and eventually moved on to work in a trading business. In 1858, he moved to Whatcom County, Washington, travelling there on a number of steamers, including the John L. Stevens and the Oregon.

Pettibone arrived in Whatcom (later Bellingham, Washington) during a time of Fraser Canyon Gold Rush and mass immigration to the Fraser River district. Later, taking advantage of the abandoned Whatcom Trail, a gold seekers' route, Pettibone erected a building with his brother there (on the site where the Whatcom Hotel was later built). They started to work as merchants, selling around $42,000 ($1,116,000 in 2020 dollars) worth of goods in the first five weeks. At the time, the city was under control of the Hudson's Bay Company and Governor Douglass, who forced the Pettibones to move their enterprise to Victoria, Canada.

Business in British Columbia and in Wisconsin during the Civil War

For some time, the Pettibones worked in Victoria, and later opened a branch firm in Langley, a city on the Fraser River. Their business as suppliers for international explorers ran until 1860. When it closed, the brothers returned to Wisconsin, where Pettibone did business in Lodi, becoming one of the biggest local merchants during the Civil War. Around 1864, Pettibone moved to Ripon, Wisconsin, and continued his merchant business. His son, Fred Curtis, joined him in 1879. The Pettibones stopped working in merchandise in 1883.

Real estate business in Bellingham

In 1883, Pettibone came back to Whatcom, becoming one of the first residents of Bellingham and an active participant in the city's life. There, he decided to enter the real estate business, and the firm Pettibone, Powell & Pettibone was opened–the first official real estate company in the city. This firm closed in 1884, but in 1890, a new one was formed under the name of Powell & Pettibone. Some years later, Pettibone fully retired from the business.

Personal life and death

In June, 1861, Pettibone married Lucy B. Peabody (in a later article, Flora Peabody) . She was born in Cleveland, Ohio, lived in Whatcom, and died at Ripon in 1882. They had four children: Alice, married to a railroad constructor T. H. Bacon; Fred Curtis of Whatcom, married to Elizabeth E. Pettibone (Crickett); Will E. of Seattle; and Louis A. of St. Paul. The Pettibones were one of the Peabody heirs, and in 1886, after a series of legal disputes over land in Bellingham, they built a family home in the heart of the city on Eldridge Avenue. The house was later named historic building. 

Pettibone's sons followed their father's steps, and in 1889 opened their own successful real estate office in Whatcom (later Bellingham) under the name of Pettibone Brothers Abstract Company. In 1892, they purchased an international shingle mill, and later owned 200 cattle and 75 horses.

Pettibone was a Republican and belonged to the Episcopal Lutheran church. He was a member of the Masonic fraternity, connected to the Ripon Commandery No. 10, K. T., of Berlin, Wisconsin, and to the Hoo Hoos.

Alfred Pettibone died on September 2, 1914, at the age of 79. He was buried in Bayview Cemetery, Bellingham.

Notes

References

Literature cited

External links 
 

Beloit College alumni
Washington (state) pioneers
People from Bellingham, Washington
19th-century American merchants
Businesspeople in real estate
1835 births
1914 deaths